Robert Pickering "Bo" Burnham (born August 21, 1990) is an American comedian, musician, actor, and filmmaker. His work combines elements of filmmaking with comedy genres such as music, sketch, and stand-up, often with a dramatic or tragic twist.

Following his success as one of the earliest YouTube stars throughout the late 2000s, Burnham gained notability in the early 2010s for his satirical and subversive stand-up and musical comedy. He made four comedy albums with Comedy Central Records, released three comedy specials—Words, Words, Words (2010), what. (2013), and Make Happy (2016)—created and starred in the MTV mockumentary series Zach Stone Is Gonna Be Famous (2013), and published the poetry book Egghead: Or, You Can't Survive on Ideas Alone (2013). He then announced a career shift away from comedy in 2016, before making his filmmaking debut as the writer and director of the critically acclaimed drama film Eighth Grade (2018). He has also directed other comedians' comedy specials, and co-starred in the Academy Award-winning comedy-thriller film Promising Young Woman (2020).

Burnham created and starred in his fourth special, Inside (2021), without a crew or audience during the COVID-19 pandemic; it was released by Netflix to widespread acclaim and was nominated in six categories at the 73rd Emmy Awards, winning Outstanding Directing for a Variety Special, Outstanding Music Direction, and Outstanding Writing for a Variety Special. At the 64th Grammy Awards, Inside was nominated for Best Music Film and Best Song Written for Visual Media, winning the latter. Three songs from the special appeared also on the Billboard charts and were certified gold in the United States, as was the accompanying album, Inside (The Songs).

Early life
Robert Pickering Burnham was born in Hamilton, Massachusetts, on August 21, 1990, the son of hospice nurse Patricia and construction company owner Scott Burnham. His mother's work was covered in a 2014 episode of This American Life. He has an older sister named Samm and an older brother named Pete, both of whom work for their father's construction company. Burnham was raised Catholic and attended St. John's Preparatory School in Danvers, Massachusetts, where he received a free education due to his mother working as the school's nurse at the time. He graduated in 2008, having been on the honor roll and involved in theater and the campus ministry program. He was accepted into the New York University Tisch School of the Arts to study experimental theatre, but deferred his admission for a year to pursue a career in comedy and eventually never attended.

Career

2006–2008: Beginnings on YouTube 
Burnham began his career on YouTube in 2006, with his videos gaining over 712 million views . In December 2006, he wanted to show two songs he had written to his older brother Pete, who had left the family home to attend university in New York City. A friend suggested that he film himself performing the songs in his bedroom and post them on YouTube, which was then a relatively new website. His song "My Whole Family..." quickly became popular when the link to its YouTube video was shared on Break.com, soon leading to it being shared on other sites.

Accompanying himself on guitar or digital piano, Burnham continued to release self-described "pubescent musical comedy" songs and videos online as his audience grew. Described in The Boston Globe as "simultaneously wholesome and disturbing, intimate in a folksy-creepy sort of way", Burnham wrote and released songs about white supremacy, Helen Keller's disabilities, homosexuality, and more. All of Burnham's early videos were recorded in and around his family's home, mostly in his bedroom, and had an intentional "do-it-yourself [feel], almost like voyeurism".

Burnham's music and performances tackle such subjects as class, race, gender, human sexuality, sex, and religion. Burnham describes his on-stage persona as a "more arrogant, stuck-up version [of] himself". When speaking with The Detroit News about his rapping, he expressed his intent to honor and respect the perspective and culture of hip-hop music.

Burnham recorded a performance in London for Comedy Central's The World Stands Up in January 2008 (aired June 30), making him the youngest person to do so at the age of 17, and signed a four-record deal with Comedy Central Records. Comedy Central Records released Burnham's first EP, the six-song Bo fo Sho, as an online release-only album on June 17, 2008. Burnham's first full album, the self-titled Bo Burnham, was released on March 10, 2009.

2009–2016: Stand-up and comedy specials 

Burnham has performed his music in the United States, including Cobb's Comedy Club, YouTube Live in San Francisco, and Caroline's Comedy Club in New York City, and internationally in London and Montreal. In August 2010, Burnham was nominated for "Best Comedy Show" at the 2010 Edinburgh Comedy Awards after his inaugural performance (of Bo Burnham: Words, Words, Words). He instead received the "Panel Prize", a £5,000 prize for "the show or act who has most captured the comedy spirit of the 2010 Fringe".

While performing at the Montreal Just for Laughs festival in 2008, Burnham met with director and producer Judd Apatow. That September, he negotiated with Universal Pictures to write and create the music for an Apatow-produced comedy film which he described as the "anti-High School Musical", although he insisted that the script is not a parody of the Disney musicals, but rather an attempt to emulate the high school he attended. Hoping to also star in the film, Burnham told Wired that he named the lead character after himself in a "not-so-subtle hint". In a March 2009 interview with Boston's Weekly Dig, he said that he was spending eight hours a day writing the music for the film and spending his evenings writing the script. Burnham's high school friend Luke Liacos was co-writing the screenplay. In an October 2010 interview with MTV, Burnham admitted that he did not know anything about the future of the project, and that it was all effectively up in the air as far as he knew.

On March 3, 2009, 15 Westminster College students (members of the campus' Gay-Straight Alliance, Black Students Association, International Club, and Cultural Diversity Organization) protested his concert there that evening, due to his use of homophobic and racist terms in performances. Of the controversy, he said, "It's so ironic because gay bashers were the ones labeling me in high school.... I try and write satire that's well-intentioned. But those intentions have to be hidden. It can't be completely clear and that's what makes it comedy." Despite the college's admission that they had booked Burnham while ignorant of his show's material, dean of students John Comerford praised the opportunities for discourse the controversy brought the school. In May 2009, viral marketing began appearing for Funny People, in which Burnham starred in an NBC sitcom called Yo Teach! In the promo, he starred opposite Jason Schwartzman as a student in the latter's English class.

On May 21, 2010, Burnham taped his first one-hour stand-up special, entitled Words Words Words, for Comedy Central from the House of Blues in Boston as part of the network's new "House of Comedy" series of stand-up specials; it aired on Comedy Central on October 16, 2010, and was released for purchase two days later. Burnham finished in first place at the 2011 Comedy Central Stand-up Showdown.

In 2013, Burnham wrote, executive-produced, and starred in Zach Stone Is Gonna Be Famous alongside Dan Lagana, Luke Liacos, and Dave Becky. The series was cancelled after one season. He also released a book of poetry called Egghead: Or, You Can't Survive on Ideas Alone.

His second special, what., was released on both Netflix and YouTube on December 17, 2013.

Burnham's third special, Make Happy, was produced by Netflix and released on June 3, 2016.

2017–2020: Filmmaking and Eighth Grade 
Burnham wrote and directed his first feature film, Eighth Grade, which was produced and distributed by A24 and premiered at the Sundance Film Festival in January 2018. The film has been universally acclaimed; among other accolades, it received the Writers Guild of America Award for Best Original Screenplay and the Directors Guild of America Award for Outstanding Directing – First-Time Feature Film. It garnered a 99% approval rating on Rotten Tomatoes based on 316 ratings, and holds an average rating of 89 out of 100 on Metacritic.

Burnham directed Jerrod Carmichael's comedy special 8 (2017) for HBO and Chris Rock's comedy special Tamborine (2018) for Netflix. In an interview with Vulture, he discussed his directorial outlook when directing a comedy special: "I approached [the special], which was me taking stock of the feelings that I get out of watching this person perform and asking, 'How can I recreate that for the audience as best as possible? How can I make a good container for the thing?' But the thing is being provided by them, so a lot of directing is just getting out of their way."

In 2019, it was announced Burnham would contribute songs to the upcoming Sesame Street film.

In 2020, Burnham played the protagonist's love interest Ryan Cooper in the black comedy revenge thriller film Promising Young Woman. The film debuted at the Sundance Film Festival, where it received critical acclaim, and was later nominated for the Academy Award for Best Picture. In an interview, Burnham stated, "This is a story I could never tell. This is a perspective I don't have. After doing my own things, it's like I really like the idea of, I just want to serve someone else's vision."

In March 2021, Burnham was cast as Boston Celtics legend Larry Bird in Winning Time: The Rise of the Lakers Dynasty from HBO. Due to scheduling conflicts, he left the series in August 2021.

2021–present: Inside 
In April 2021, Burnham ended his social media hiatus to announce that May 30 would see the release of his fourth special, Inside. Created by Burnham alone in his home's guest house without a crew or audience during the COVID-19 pandemic, Inside received widespread acclaim. It was nominated in six categories for the 73rd Primetime Creative Arts Emmy Awards, winning three for Outstanding Music Direction, Outstanding Writing, and Outstanding Directing for a Variety Special. Burnham also received two nominations at the 64th Annual Grammy Awards for Best Music Film and Best Song Written for Visual Media ("All Eyes on Me"), although the special was ruled ineligible for Best Comedy Album. Three songs from the album ("Bezos I", "All Eyes on Me", and "Welcome to the Internet") earned Burnham his first charting songs on the US Bubbling Under Hot 100 and Global 200 charts. They were certified gold in the United States, as did the accompanying album, Inside (The Songs).

Burnham directed, edited, and executive produced Carmichael's comedy special Rothaniel (2022), which received acclaim, including the 74th Emmy award for best writing for a variety special.

On May 30, 2022, the one-year anniversary of Inside, Burnham released 63 minutes of unseen footage from the special on YouTube. Titled The Inside Outtakes, it has garnered over 6 million views as of August 2022. The video received positive reviews. In June 2022, he released an accompanying album with the same name containing all the songs from the video and two new others. He also released Inside (Deluxe), an album containing all of the songs from Inside and the outtakes, as well as all of the ambient and instrumental tracks from the special and its outtakes.

Burnham has reportedly submitted "Five Years" from The Inside Outtakes to the 2023 Grammys' visual-media song category.

Style
Burnham's comedic style is often categorized as satire, using offensive language and covering topics such as homophobia, mental illness, sexism, and racism for both shock value and social commentary. He has cited Kate Berlant, Catherine Breillat, George Carlin, John Cassavetes, Flight of the Conchords, Mitch Hedberg, Anthony Jeselnik, Stephen Lynch, Demetri Martin, Steve Martin, Tim Minchin, and Hans Teeuwen as influences. He named Steve Martin as the most important of these. His musical style has also drawn comparisons to Tom Lehrer, and he was reported to have written his 2009 song "New Math" as a tribute to Lehrer's 1965 song of the same name.

Controversy 
In response to controversy surrounding his older material, Burnham said in 2009, "I try and write satire that's well-intentioned. But those intentions have to be hidden. It can't be completely clear, and that's what makes it comedy." As his career progressed, he began expressing regret for his early material, which he described as "shock-jock offensive comedy done by a sixteen-year-old without any tact". During press for his film Eighth Grade in 2018, he used the controversies surrounding his work to express concerns about the new concept of teenagers' mistakes being immortalized on the internet, telling Off Camera, "I'm happy to be an example of someone who failed out loud publicly, in a certain way, and who has hopefully been able to evolve and get past that. And I do worry that kids don't have that freedom anymore." In an interview with NPR, he addressed the problematic nature of his comedy and said, "I have a lot of material from back then that I'm not proud of and I think is offensive and I think is not helpful." He further addressed this topic on the song "Problematic" from his 2021 comedy special Inside.

Personal life
Burnham is known to be a private person and rarely gives interviews unless he has a project to promote. He lives in Los Angeles and has been in a relationship with filmmaker Lorene Scafaria since 2013.

Work

Filmography

Film

Television

Discography

 Bo Burnham (2009)
Words, Words, Words (2010)
what. (2013)
 Inside (The Songs) (2021)

Tours

Bibliography 
 Egghead: Or, You Can't Survive on Ideas Alone (2013)

Awards and nominations
At the 2010 Edinburgh Festival Fringe, he was nominated for the main Edinburgh Comedy Award and won both the Edinburgh Comedy Awards' panel prize and the Malcolm Hardee "Act Most Likely to Make a Million Quid" Award.

For his 2018 film Eighth Grade and 2021 comedy special Inside he received several awards and nominations for his writing and directing, including the following:

References

External links

 
 Bo Burnham  at Comedy Central
 
 
 

1990 births
21st-century American comedians
21st-century American male actors
21st-century American male writers
21st-century American rappers
21st-century American screenwriters
American comedy musicians
American male comedians
American male film actors
American male television actors
American male television writers
American male voice actors
American stand-up comedians
American television writers
American YouTubers
Comedians from Massachusetts
Comedy-related YouTube channels
Filmmakers from Massachusetts
Grammy Award winners
Living people
Male actors from Massachusetts
People from Hamilton, Massachusetts
Primetime Emmy Award winners
Rappers from Massachusetts
Screenwriters from Massachusetts
Singer-songwriters from Massachusetts
Vine (service) celebrities